Franklyn is a 2008 British science fantasy film written and directed by Gerald McMorrow as his debut feature. Produced by Jeremy Thomas, it stars Ryan Phillippe, Eva Green and Sam Riley. Shooting took place in London in the fourth quarter of 2007. Franklyn held its world premiere at the 52nd London Film Festival on 16 October 2008. The film was released in the United Kingdom on 27 February 2009.

Synopsis
Split between the parallel realities of contemporary London and the otherworldly metropolis of Meanwhile City, Franklyn follows the tales of four characters. Jonathan Preest (Ryan Phillippe) is a masked vigilante who will not rest until he finds his nemesis: "the Individual". Emilia (Eva Green) is a troubled young art student whose rebellion may turn out to be deadly. Milo (Sam Riley) is a heartbroken thirty something yearning for the purity of first love. Peter (Bernard Hill) is a man steeped in religion, searching desperately for his missing son amongst London's homeless.

Cast
 Ryan Phillippe as Jonathan Preest, a masked vigilante detective from Meanwhile City. Preest is the only atheist in town.
 Luke Pettican as Young Jonathan Preest
 Eva Green in a dual role as Emilia and Sally. Emilia is a beautiful but damaged student who films her would-be suicide attempts as installations for her art degree. Eva Green has compared her to real people, Sophie Calle and Tracey Emin and described Sally as "full of life, very witty, big sense of humor."
 Sam Riley as Milo, a young man who has just been jilted at the altar. Riley was cast based on his performance as Ian Curtis in the 2007 film Control.
 Bernard Hill as Peter Esser, a Cambridge church warden looking for his wayward son in London.
 James Faulkner as Pastor Bone
 Art Malik as Tarrant, the head of Meanwhile, City's Ministry
 Susannah York as Margaret
 Richard Coyle as Dan
 Kika Markham as Naomi
 Vauxhall Jermaine as Leon
 Stephen Walters as Wormsnakes/Wasnik

Production
Writer-director Gerald McMorrow wrote the original science fiction script Franklyn as his feature debut. It depicts a similar dystopia to his 2002 short Thespian X.  In October 2006, actor Ewan McGregor was cast as the lead in the film, which was slated to begin production in summer 2007.  However, McGregor broke his leg in a biking accident in February 2007 during the second series of Long Way Round and was forced to leave the project. Actors Ryan Phillippe, Eva Green, and newcomer Sam Riley were cast in Franklyn in September 2007.  Phillippe was the last to be cast in what McMorrow termed a 'now or never' situation, saying of their first meeting: "You have preconceptions about people... You expect the bleach-blond Californian kid and what you got was an incredibly erudite, brought-up-the-wrong-side-of-the-tracks Philadelphia actor. When I met him we did not stop talking all afternoon."

McMorrow's visual inspiration for Meanwhile City came from the religious iconography he saw in Mexico City shopping malls.
He later explained: "The idea was that if you're going to have a capital city based on religion, you've got somewhere like Florence or Rome and send somewhere like that three miles into the sky... Part of Preest's delirium and fantasies are based on the religion surrounding him and comics he read and films he saw. He sort of pieces together a jigsaw of his own delusions." Preest's mask was primarily influenced by Claude Rains' film of H. G. Wells' novel The Invisible Man. Preest also bears a resemblance to the character Rorschach in Watchmen, not only in terms of clothing but in terms of character.

Franklyn had a budget of £6 million, of which £1 million was provided by the UK Film Council through its Premiere Fund. Production began on 24 September 2007 in and around London, and was completed by December 2007. Major locations included an East End bar and Greenwich Naval College, where many of the CGI sequences were shot. McMorrow described his approach, "I used an atypical and off-kilter background, and told a story that wouldn't normally be told. The film was set around some tricky locations but we managed to shoot it." The film entered post-production by April 2008.

Reception
Franklyn opened to mixed reviews, receiving a 57% Fresh rating on Rotten Tomatoes. Rights to Franklyn were purchased from sales and financier HanWay Films by Contender Films for the United Kingdom, and Seville Pictures for Canada, with both distributors operating under their parent company Entertainment One.  Franklyn premiered at the 52nd London Film Festival on 16 October 2008.  The film was released theatrically in the United Kingdom on 27 February 2009.

Dave Calhoun of Time Out opined: "Produced by British industry veteran Jeremy Thomas, McMorrow’s admirable if not entirely coherent debut follows the lives of four people in and around London who are attempting to cope with various crises in their lives, from a relationship break-up and the search for a missing son to the psychological after-effects of military service. The film treads a fine line between realism and fantasy, occasionally dipping out of the world as we know it to visit a seductively strange vision of the capital that appears part-futuristic and part-medieval (and which gives the film its name). Riley follows Control by leaning heavily on middle-distance stares and up-turned collars, while Green is a troubled art student with a good line in haute couture, and Philippe is a troubled ex-soldier. The main problem is that by the time this tricksy film finally plays its hand, many viewers may already have been lost at the wayside."

Derek Elley of Variety thought the premise better suited to a novella rather than a feature film, believing that Franklyn lacked an emotional payoff. Elley criticized the script for not developing the ideas it introduced and for lacking background on the characters. The critic also considered Phillippe and Riley to be poor casting in their roles, while Green could not present her dual roles dramatically.  Jason Solomons of The Observer reviewed the film, "The visual style is impressive but the storylines are thin and the characters all extremely irritating." Fionnuala Halligan of Screen International weighed in: "It's unusual in the current film-making climate to see an independent director making such an ambitious debut as Gerald McMorrow's Franklyn. He aims high, visually and conceptually, but a more experienced director would have trouble finding the right tone to pull this intricate plot off. Notices should be at least encouraging: McMorrow has pulled off a very handsome look on a limited budget."

References

External links
 
 

2008 films
2008 drama films
2008 fantasy films
2008 independent films
2008 science fiction action films
2000s British films
2000s crime drama films
2000s English-language films
2000s science fiction drama films
2000s vigilante films
Alternate timeline films
British crime drama films
British fantasy films
British independent films
British science fiction action films
British science fiction drama films
British neo-noir films
British vigilante films
Dystopian films
Film4 Productions films
Films set in London
Films shot in London
Films produced by Jeremy Thomas